Moshirabad (also Romanized as Moshīrābād; also known as Mushurābād and Shaitanābād) is a village in Esperan Rural District, in the Central District of Tabriz County, East Azerbaijan Province, Iran. At the 2006 census, its population was 66, in 16 families.

References 

Populated places in Tabriz County